"Autograph" is a song recorded by Canadian country rock singer Dallas Smith for his third solo studio album, Side Effects (2016). It was written by Nicolle Galyon, Ross Copperman, and Haley Georgia. The song was released to digital retailers on August 19, 2016 through 604 Records as the album's third official single.

Background
Smith intended to record the song on his previous album, Lifted (2014), but it was on hold for Keith Urban, who was at the time recording for his 2013 album, Fuse. When the song did not make the final cut of the album, it was offered to Smith again. He "quickly" recorded the song for inclusion on a future project that became Side Effects.

Commercial performance
"Autograph" was the most-downloaded song for the chart week of August 29, 2016, according to DMDS. It entered the Billboard Canada Country chart dated September 17, 2016 at number 34 and is Smith's record-extending fourteenth consecutive top-10 single, encompassing his entire singles discography. The song reached number one on the chart dated November 26, 2016, becoming Smith's second chart-topper. "Autograph" entered the Canadian Hot 100 at number 97 on the chart dated November 19, 2016. It later reached a peak position of 95.

Charts

Certifications

Release history

References

2013 songs
2016 singles
Dallas Smith songs
604 Records singles
Songs written by Ross Copperman
Songs written by Nicolle Galyon
Song recordings produced by Joey Moi